Carlos Acevedo López (born 19 April 1996) is a Mexican professional footballer who plays as a goalkeeper for Liga MX club Santos Laguna and the Mexico national team.

Club career
Acevedo made his Liga MX debut with Santos Laguna on 20 August 2016 in a match lost to Cruz Azul which resulted, 3–1.

Prior to the start of the 2021 Guardianes tournament, club manager Guillermo Almada named him as captain following the departure of former captain Julio Furch to sibling club Atlas.

International career
In December 2021, Acevedo received his first call-up to the senior national team by Gerardo Martino, and made his debut on 8 December 2021 in a friendly match against Chile.

Career statistics

Club

International

Honours
Santos Laguna
Liga MX: Clausura 2018

Individual
Liga MX All-Star: 2022

References

External links
 

1996 births
Living people
Association football goalkeepers
Mexico international footballers
Santos Laguna footballers
Liga MX players
Liga Premier de México players
People from Torreón
Footballers from Coahuila
Mexican footballers